Sometimes Always Never is a 2018 British comedy-drama film directed by Carl Hunter and written by Frank Cottrell Boyce, starring Bill Nighy, Sam Riley, and Jenny Agutter.

Premise 
Alan is a stylish tailor with moves as sharp as his suits. But he's spent years searching tirelessly for his missing son, Michael, who stormed out over a game of Scrabble. With a body to identify and his family torn apart, Alan must repair the relationship with his younger son and identify an online player who he thinks could be Michael, so that he can finally move on and reunite his family.

Cast 

 Bill Nighy as Alan
 Sam Riley as Peter
 Jenny Agutter as Margaret
 Alice Lowe as Sue
 Tim McInnerny as Arthur
 Alexei Sayle as Bill
 Louis Healy as Jack

Reception 
The website's critical consensus reads, "Like the grieving Scrabble enthusiast at the heart of its unique story, Sometimes Always Never scores high enough to be well worth a play." Metacritic reports a score of 67/100 based on 19 critics, indicating "generally favorable reviews".

Kambole Campbell of Empire wrote, "Despite strong performances and a witty script, Sometimes Always Never lays on the homage a little too thick for its own good, shortchanging itself by imitating a particularly idiosyncratic style." Wendy Ide of The Guardian wrote, "The danger of an offbeat British film, particularly one that is as emphatically designed as this, is that it could teeter into whimsy and artifice. But thanks to Cottrell Boyce, and the assured direction of first-time feature film-maker Carl Hunter, the emotional beats are authentic and the distinctive look of the film – it takes its aesthetic cues from '60s ties and '70s wallpaper – never upstages the story."

References

External links 

 

2018 comedy-drama films
British comedy-drama films
Works about Scrabble
2010s English-language films
2010s British films